Steintor is a Hanover Stadtbahn station served by all C and D lines. The C lines were built underground, which is the junction for all lines continuing west. Lines 4, 5 and 16 branch off eastwards towards the next station,  Königsworther Platz (the latter one is the terminus at that station), while lines 6 and 11 branch off northbound, where the next station is Christuskirche.

D-Tunnel 
Beneath the current C line platforms there are additional D-Tunnel platforms which have never been built. Also these have 2 side platforms.

Overground station 

The current overground station is home to D lines (10 and 17), and also these have 2 side platforms.

References

Hanover Stadtbahn stations